Between 1978 to 1985, Kenner produced and sold action figures based on the Star Wars franchise. From a line of over 100 unique toys, a total of more than 300 million units were sold during their original run. Kenner began producing new Star Wars action figures in 1995.

History
The license for Star Wars action figures was offered in 1976 to the Mego Corporation, which was the leading company in action figures in the 1970s. Mego refused the offer and the license was subsequently picked up by Kenner, a division of  General Mills Fun Group.

Star Wars (1977) was the first film to successfully market toys based on the movie. In fact, they were so successful that George Lucas independently used the funds to finance the next two movie chapters, The Empire Strikes Back (1980) and Return of the Jedi (1983).

Although the original Star Wars film had been released in May 1977, Kenner was unprepared for the unprecedented response to the film and the high demand for toys, mainly due to George Lucas's unwillingness to provide character/vehicle designs for fear his creations would be plagiarized by movie/tv competitors. Unable to build sufficient stock in time for the lucrative Christmas market, they instead sold an "Early Bird Certificate Package" which included a certificate which could be mailed to Kenner and redeemed for four Star Wars action figures. The first four figures to be distributed were Luke Skywalker, Princess Leia, Chewbacca and R2-D2. The box also contains a diorama display stand, some stickers, and a Star Wars fan club membership card.

By the time the action figures were offered for direct sale in shops, the range had been augmented with a further eight figures—C-3PO, Darth Vader, Stormtrooper, Obi-Wan Kenobi, Han Solo, Jawa, Sand People, and Death Squad Commander—bringing the total number of figures in the initial release to twelve. These were supplemented later in 1978 with a number of vehicle and playset accessories, as well as the J.C. Penney exclusive Sonic controlled landspeeder and the Sears exclusive Cantina adventure playset which introduced four new figures.

Three of the four figures that were first brought out in the Sears Cantina set were released for individual sale, as well as a variant of the fourth, and with a further four figures later in 1978, bringing the total number of figures to 20. Demand for the action figures and accessories was such that Kenner continued to have difficulty fulfilling demand. Shortages of the toys in the lead up to Christmas 1978 led some to claim that Kenner was deliberately manipulating the market. Sales of Kenner's Star Wars range in 1978 reached 40 million units, accounting for a revenue of $100 million.

In the anticipation of the release of the sequel movie The Empire Strikes Back, Kenner offered its first mail-in promotion, in which four proofs of purchase could be redeemed for a new action figure, Boba Fett. This figure was originally intended to feature a backpack with a firing missile, but this was abandoned due to safety concerns. Similar mail-in promotions were periodically offered through to 1984.

Sales in 1979 again topped $100 million. Kenner continued to introduce waves of action figures from the sequels and in 1984, the year following the release of the movie Return of the Jedi, the range totaled 79 unique character designs (not including the retired versions of R2-D2 and C-3PO).

In 1985, the figure range was renamed Power of the Force in which a further 15 figures were released. Two further ranges of Star Wars action figures were also released, based on the animated series, Star Wars: Droids and Star Wars: Ewoks. The Droids range comprised 12 figures (two of which were identical to figures from the main Star Wars line) and the Ewoks line comprised six figures.

By mid-1985, the demand for Star Wars merchandise had slowed and Kenner discontinued production of its action figures. However, Kenner would produce the new line of Star Wars toys which began in 1995.

Description
The Star Wars action figures are plastic, usually smaller than four inches (10 cm), and are typically poseable at five points on their bodies, but there are many differences and unique qualities in the individual figures that depart from these norms. Kenner's Star Wars action figures were produced along with vehicles and playsets based on the Star Wars movies.

The majority of figures were packaged individually attached to "cardbacks" in a plastic blister.

List of Kenner Star Wars action figures

Figure variations
Variations exist for most of the different figures. These can range from major resculpts and differences in accessories supplied with the figures, to differences in paint detailing, for instance in hair color, or differences in sculpting materials. Some variations command higher prices in the collector market due to relative scarcity.

During the Empire Strikes Back run, the R2-D2 figure was altered to include an extendable "sensorscope." Similarly, C-3PO was resculpted with removable limbs. In 1985, R2-D2 was again altered to feature a pop-up lightsaber. Both the removable limb C-3PO and pop-up lightsaber R2-D2 were offered with alternate paint detailing in the Droids range.

The lightsaber-wielding characters originally featured a double-telescoping saber mechanism. This was changed to a single-telescoping mechanism early in 1978. As the Luke Skywalker figure was part of the Early Bird promotion, proportionately more of these were released with the double-telescoping mechanism, while double telescoping Ben (Obi-Wan) Kenobi and Darth Vader figures are comparatively more rare and sought-after.

The Sears exclusive Cantina adventure playset contains four action figures. The Snaggletooth figure initially included wears a blue outfit with silver disco style boots, and is about the same size as the Luke and Han figures. Upon George Lucas's request, this "Blue Snaggletooth" was subsequently corrected to represent the character as actually featured in the movie; and a resculpted shorter, barefoot, red-outfitted figure was released. Only the corrected "Red Snaggletooth" was released on blistered cardbacks, which made the "Blue Snaggletooth" more scarce and sought after by collectors.

Early Han Solo figures have a somewhat diminutive head sculpt. This was later replaced by a larger sculpt.

Early Jawa figures were released with a vinyl cape similar to that of Obi-Wan Kenobi. This was later changed to a fabric cloak.

Cardback variations
From the period through 1977 to mid-1984, figures sold individually in stores were issued on cardbacks that corresponded to the most current movie, with figures being sold on cardbacks with Star Wars designs through to 1980, then on Empire Strikes Back cards through to 1983, followed by Return of the Jedi cards and Power of the Force cards in 1984.

As the number of figures in the range increased, the cardback design would be altered accordingly. Thus the earliest figures released for direct sale in shops were issued on a cardback, the rear of which illustrated the then full range of 12 figures, known as a 12-back. The 12-back was supplanted by the 20-back, and subsequently by the 21-back, the 31-back, the 32-back, the 41-back, the 45-back, the 47-back, the 48-back, the 65-back, the 77-back, the 79-back and the 92-back.

Variations exist for each of the cardback fronts. These range from differences in promotional offer stickers applied to the card to differences in the photograph illustrating the character. Similarly variations exist for all of the cardback rear designs with the exceptions of the 47-back and 92-back designs that were only available in a single version.

, there are 57 different cardback front-rear combinations recognized. This does not include figures released through overseas companies or the Droids or Ewoks ranges.

Non-US licenses
Star Wars figures were offered for sale in a number of countries outside of the US. These were usually sold through other companies, many of which were also subsidiaries of General Mills.

In the UK, the Star Wars license was held by Palitoy, which imported the figures and packaged them in the UK on Palitoy branded cardbacks. Analogous arrangements were in place in Spain with the company PBP/Poch, in France with Meccano, in the Benelux countries with Clipper, in Germany with Parker, in Italy with Harbert and in Scandinavia with Brio/Playmix.

In Japan, the line was first controlled by the company Takara, then by Popy and finally by Tsukuda.
 The licence was acquired in Australia by Toltoys, while in Mexico it was held by Lili Ledy and in Brazil by Glasslite.

In certain cases, figures produced by the non-US licensed companies are substantially different from those sold by Kenner. Takara, for example, sold resculpted versions of Darth Vader, Stormtrooper, and C-3PO. Lili Ledy used different paint detailing and different fabric accessories. Glasslite figures were molded using slightly different, glossier plastic and used different paint detailing. The Glasslite Droids range was also notable in that it included a character "Vlix" that had not been issued in other countries. The Vlix figure was prototyped for the Kenner line but never made it past the stage of being mocked up on a card.

Towards the end of the Star Wars figure run, figures for the European market were issued on  cardbacks, so-called as the cardback front had three logos in English, French, and Spanish. The cardback rear was a unique design showing 70 characters.  are in somewhat greater demand amongst collectors due to overstock having been bought by the US company Kay Bee. The character "Yak Face" that had only previously been issued in Canada and Australia was also available on the  card.

Reproductions
As the figures were intended as and generally used as toys, accessories such as weapons and cloaks were often lost or stickers were damaged. Once a collectors' market had been established, some collectors started replacing accessories with reproduction items. Such items are considered undesirable amongst collectors in some countries, particularly where figure variations centering on differences in accessories has led to a price premium, such as with the double telescoping lightsabers or the vinyl-caped Jawa.

Some hard to obtain figures have also been reproduced, often with the aim of passing them off as original, authentic figures. Notable examples include the rocket firing Boba Fett prototype and unpainted prototypes of regular figures.

Bootlegs
While officially licensed figures were produced in many countries, others had no official means of distribution. Taking advantage of consumer demand for the toys, manufacturers in some countries released unlicensed, bootleg figures. These vary in materials, casting method and in quality. For example, some of the figures produced by the manufacturer Uzay in Turkey, are of a high standard and were often cast in unconventional colors with little regard to authenticity. The quirkiness of these figures with their often bizarre psychedelic cardbacks have led to demand from collectors and they frequently demand a high price premium.

Legacy
A renewed interest in Star Wars was apparent by the mid-1990s, due to a rerelease of the trilogy on laserdisc and VHS and in anticipation of the upcoming Star Wars Special Edition. Kenner, which had been bought by Tonka in 1987 and subsequently by Hasbro in 1991, took advantage of this and, in 1995, released a new line of Star Wars action figures, again under the logo Power of the Force. These figures were easily distinguishable from the vintage range due to the new figures being sculpted in more "heroic" style, with larger muscles, and are known to collectors as Power of the Force 2. The Power of the Force 2 figures continued to be branded as Kenner until 1999, when they were rebranded as Hasbro. Hasbro continues to market Star Wars action figures to the present day.

Kenner's success with the Star Wars line motivated creators of other action-adventure movies to market their own action figure lines.

In popular culture
Two of Steven Spielberg's 1982 films, Poltergeist and E.T. the Extra-Terrestrial, feature scenes showing Star Wars action figures.

Star Wars action figures are the subject of a 2014 direct-to-video documentary film, Plastic Galaxy: The Story of Star Wars Toys.

Star Wars action figures and toys were the subject of episode one of the 2017 Netflix documentary The Toys That Made Us.

A 2020 episode of Star Wars: The Clone Wars features a group of three aliens wearing outfits matching original Kenner toys.

See also
Star Wars: The Vintage Collection

References

External links
 Star Wars action figures at the Star Wars Wiki

1970s toys
1980s toys
Action figures
Hasbro products
Star Wars merchandise
Products introduced in 1978
1978 establishments in the United States